Gobio delyamurei, also termed the Chornaya gudgeon, is a species of gudgeon, a small freshwater fish in the family Cyprinidae, native to Crimea. It is considered to be critically endangered, as it lives only along a 1-km stretch in the  Chornaya River, below the Chornaya Gorge. Because of water abstraction, the site is vulnerable to drying up in the summer time, particularly if climate change will further intensify the droughts.

This is a demersal fish, up to 10.4 cm long. It was described as an independent species in 2005.

Named in honor of Soviet ichthyologist Semion Lyudvigovich Delyamure, author of several papers and books on Crimean fishes.

References

 

Gobio
Taxa named by Jörg Freyhof
Taxa named by Alexander Mikhailovich Naseka
Fish described in 2005
Cyprinid fish of Europe